Narayan Khadka is a central member of Nepali Congress who has served as the Foreign minister of Nepal since 2021. He has worked previously as Minister of Urban Development under Sushil Koirala-led government.

He is a member of the 2nd Nepalese Constituent Assembly. He won the Udayapur–1 seat in 2013 Nepalese Constituent Assembly election from the Nepali Congress. He was appointed as Foreign Minister by President Bidhya Devi Bhandari on September 22, 2021.

Personal life
Narayan Khadka was born on 20 March 1949 in Bhojpur to Chitra Bahadur Khadka and Dharma Kumari Khadka. He has done his Ph.D. in Economics from Pune, India.

Political career
He joined politics in 1967. He had served as the vice-chairman of National Planning Commission of Nepal.

He was also the member of 1st Nepalese Constituent Assembly where he was a member of the National Interest Preservation Committee.

References

1949 births
Living people
People from Bhojpur District, Nepal
Nepali Congress politicians from Koshi Province
Government ministers of Nepal
Nepal MPs 2017–2022
Foreign Ministers of Nepal
Members of the 2nd Nepalese Constituent Assembly
Members of the 1st Nepalese Constituent Assembly
Nepal MPs 2022–present